The 27th Intelligence Squadron is an active squadron of the United States Air Force, stationed at Langley Air Force Base, part of Joint Base Langley-Eustis, near Hampton, Virginia.  It is assigned to the 480th Intelligence, Surveillance and Reconnaissance Wing.

The squadron was first organized in February 1943 as the 27th Photographic Reconnaissance Squadron.  After training in the United States, the squadron moved to the European Theater of Operations, where it engaged in combat until V-E Day.  It earned a Distinguished Unit Citation for its work during Operation Overlord, the invasion of France, in the spring of 1944.  It remained in Europe until late fall of 1945, when it returned to the United States and was inactivated.

Mission
The 27th Intelligence Squadron mission is to provide "behind the scenes" communication and network services which tie into the analytical nodes of the Air Force Distributed Common Ground System, enabling the 480th Intelligence, Surveillance and Reconnaissance Wing to deliver critical information to U.S. and Coalition combat forces operating in hot spots around the world.

The 27th sustains the 480th Wing's daily operations. It operates and maintains automated production support systems, a secondary imagery dissemination system and photographic and lithographic facilities for the wing.

Organization
The 27th Intelligence Squadron comprises two flights, a Production Services Flight and a Systems and Data Base Management Flight.

The Production Services Flight includes a Visual Information Branch, providing digital and wet imagery processing, reproduction and graphic design: a Dissemination Branch that distributes and tracks outgoing products, maintains a chart library with worldwide coverage and the basic target and training graphic repository; a Security Branch maintaining security clearances and facility security devices; a Facility Branch managing the facility and grounds; and a Logistics Branch managing the group's supply and equipment accounts.

History

World War II
The squadron was activated as the 27th Photographic Reconnaissance Squadron at Peterson Field, Colorado in February 1943 and equipped with Lockheed P-38 Lightnings and two reconnaissance models of the Lightning, the F-4 and the F-5.  It was one of the original squadrons of the 6th Photographic Group.  The squadron trained with the 6th Group until September 1943, when the 6th moved overseas to the Southwest Pacific Theater.  The 27th moved overseas in November, but to England, where it was attached to the 7th Photographic Group.

The squadron flew missions supporting Eighth Air Force's strategic bombing campaign by photographing potential targets and flying over recently struck areas to provide bomb damage assessment.  It also provided information on enemy forces disposition and movements.  In preparation for Operation Overlord, the invasion of Normandy, the unit concentrated on providing photographic information on airfields, cities, factories and seaports in France, Belgium and the Netherlands.  Pre-invasion coverage was extended to the Low Countries to mask the intended invasion location. Its reconnaissance of marshalling yards, canals, highways and other transportation routes contributed to the success of the Normandy campaign, earning the 27th a Distinguished Unit Citation.

In July 1944, the unit provided coverage of launch sites for V-1 flying bombs and V-2 rockets.  From late August, the 27th provided coverage for advancing Allied forces.  The squadron provided photo coverage for Operation Market Garden, the airborne attacks in the Netherlands.  In November the squadron moved to France for closer cooperation with VIII Fighter Command, and flew missions supporting ground forces engaged in the Battle of the Bulge from Denain/Prouvy Airfield.  In 1945, as losses mounted among reconnaissance aircraft operating over the Continent, it began to fly North American P-51 Mustangs to provide fighter cover for the 7th Group's unarmed Lightnings.  The squadron also flew a few F-6 reconnaissance models of the Mustang.  After V-E Day, the squadron participated in the final bomb damage assessment of Germany.  Most, if not all, aircraft were disposed of to depots by September, and the squadron returned to the United States in December and was inactivated at Camp Kilmer, New Jersey in December.

Intelligence operations
The squadron was dormant until September 1990, when it was redesignated the 27th Tactical Intelligence Squadron and activated at Langley Air Force Base, Virginia as part of the 480th Tactical Intelligence Group of Tactical Air Command.  In December 2003 the 480th Intelligence Wing was activated to manage the Distributed Common Ground System and the squadron was assigned to it.  The Distributed Common Ground System disseminates intelligence information collected by Lockheed U-2 aircraft and General Atomics MQ-1 Predator, Northrop Grumman RQ-4 Global Hawk and General Atomics MQ-9 Reaper unmanned aerial vehicles to combat commanders, no matter what their location may be.

As Distributed Ground System stations became operational, the squadron worked to connect the new stations with the system.  This included stations at Hickam Air Force Base in 2004, Langley Air Force Base in 2005, three Air National Guard operated stations in 2006 and a center at Beale Air Force Base in 2011.  The squadron also participates in exercises on a regular basis.

In 2013, the squadron won the  Lt. Gen. Harold W. Grant information dominance award as the best small communications and information unit in the Air Force.  The award was made for the squadron's "sustained superior performance and professional excellence while managing core cyberspace and information dominance functions and for contributions that most improved Air Force Department of Defense operations and missions."  This award was followed by earning the Chief Master Sgt. James C. Swindell award for having the best communications and information systems operation in Twenty-Fifth Air Force from 1 September 2013 through 31 August 2014.

Lineage
 Constituted as the 27th Photographic Reconnaissance Squadron on 5 February 1943
 Redesignated 27th Photographic Squadron (Light) on 5 February 1943
 Activated on 9 February 1943
 Redesignated 27th Photographic Reconnaissance Squadron on 11 August 1943
 Inactivated on 21 December 1945
 Redesignated 27th Tactical Intelligence Squadron on 1 September 1990 and activated
 Redesignated 27th Air Intelligence Squadron on 1 November 1991
 Redesignated 27th Intelligence Squadron on 1 October 1993
 Redesignated 27th Intelligence Support Squadron on 1 December 2003
 Redesignated 27th Intelligence Squadron on 1 January 2009

Assignments
 6th Photographic Group (later 6th Photographic Reconnaissance and Mapping Group, 6th Photographic Reconnaissance Group), 9 February 1943
 Third Air Force, 9 October 1943
 III Reconnaissance Command, 12 October 1943
 7th Photographic Reconnaissance and Mapping Group (later 7th Photographic Group, 7th Reconnaissance Group), (attached c. 4 November 1943) 9 December 1943 – 21 November 1945 (attached to VIII Air Force Service Command 9 November 1944, VIII Air Force Fighter Command, 26 January – 22 April 1945)
 Unknown 21 November 1945 – 21 December 1945
 480th Tactical Intelligence Group (later 480th Air Intelligence Group, 480th Intelligence Group), 1 September 1990
 480th Intelligence Wing (later 480th Intelligence, Surveillance and Reconnaissance Wing), 1 December 2003 – present

Stations
 Peterson Field, Colorado, 9 February 1943
 RAF Mount Farm (Station 234), England, 4 November 1943
 Denain/Prouvy Airfield (A-83), France, 9 November 1944
 RAF Chalgrove (Station 465), England, 29 April 1945
 Frankfurt-Eschborn Airfield 14 October 1945
 Poix, France, 15 October 1945 – 26 November 1945
 Camp Kilmer, New Jersey, 20 – 21 December 1945
 Langley Air Force Base (later Joint Base Langley-Eustis), 1 September 1990 – present

Aircraft

 Lockheed F-4 Lightning, 1943
 Lockheed F-5 Lightning, 1943–1945
 North American F-6 Mustang, 1945
 Lockheed P-38 Lightning, 1943–1945
 North American P-51 Mustang, 1945

Awards and campaigns

See also

 List of United States Air Force squadrons

References

Notes
 Explanatory notes

 Citations

Bibliography

 
 
 
 
 
  (undated, includes information through 2012)

External links
 

027
Military units and formations established in 1990
Military units and formations in Virginia